Bradley Thomas Badger (born January 11, 1975) is a former American football guard and tackle. He was originally drafted by the Washington Redskins in the fifth round of the 1997 NFL Draft.  He played college football at Stanford University.

High school career
Badger attended Corvallis High School in Corvallis, Oregon and starred in football, basketball, and baseball.  He was an All-American selection and rated Oregon's best prospect by Tom Lemming's Prep Football Report at Corvallis High School.  In six games as a senior tight end, he had 12 receptions for 260 yards and three touchdowns.  As a junior, he earned honorable mention All-State honors, catching 18 passes for 252 yards and a score.  Badger also lettered in baseball and basketball.  He was named honorable mention All-State in basketball as a junior and first-team All-State in his senior year at center.

College career
At Stanford University, Badger was converted from a tight end into an offensive lineman.  He was a three-year starter for the Cardinal, starting 34 of 35 games dating back to his sophomore year.  As a senior, he was named to the All Pac-10 first-team.

Professional career

1997 NFL Combine and Draft
Badger was invited to the 1997 NFL Combine held at the RCA Dome in Indianapolis.  Badger's 20-yard shuttle time of 4.13 seconds was the fastest of any offensive lineman that year, and to this day is still the fastest time by any offensive guard or tackle officially timed at the NFL Combine, having only been matched in 2017 by Jessamen Dunker of Tennessee State.

Initially projected to be a late first day selection, Badger was drafted in the fifth round on day two of the 1997 NFL Draft by the Washington Redskins.

Washington Redskins (1997-1999)
Badger started the season opener in his rookie season at right guard against the Carolina Panthers.  He filled in for starter Tre Johnson, who was recovering from off-season shoulder surgery.  In that start, Badger helped the Redskins to 198 rushing yards, their third-highest output of the season.  He finished the season as a reserve, playing in 12 games.

In Badger's second season, offensive line coach and former Redskins all-pro guard Russ Grimm and head coach Norv Turner, shuffled the offensive line around and moved Badger to left tackle. After ten starts at left tackle, Badger was moved back inside to left guard.  He started all 16 games in 1998.

In year three for Badger in DC, he was primarily used as a backup at offensive guard.  He played in 14 games, missing 2 with an ankle injury, and started 4 games.

Minnesota Vikings (2000-2001)
After playing for the Redskins for three seasons, Badger was signed by the Minnesota Vikings as a restricted free agent on April 10, 2000.  The Redskins chose to not match the Vikings offer, and received a fifth round pick as compensation from the Vikings.  Badger played exclusively as a backup in 2000 for the Vikings.  In 2001, he moved into the starting lineup after longtime incumbent Todd Steussie was released for cap considerations.  Badger started 12 of 13 games at tackle, while battling injuries throughout the season.

Oakland Raiders (2002-2006)
On April 11, 2002, Badger was signed to a one year deal as an unrestricted free agent by the Oakland Raiders. Badger played exclusively as a backup in 2002, however he did appear in Super Bowl XXXVII where the Raiders were defeated by the Tampa Bay Buccaneers.  In his second season with the Raiders, Badger appeared in all 16 games at guard, starting 11 of them.

In five seasons playing for the Raiders, Badger played in 62 games, starting 31 of them.  Badger was released by the Raiders on April 21, 2007.

Arizona Cardinals (2007)
After early pre-season injuries occurred on the Arizona Cardinals offensive line, the Cardinals needed to bolster there roster and Badger was signed on August 14, 2007.  Badger was released by the Arizona Cardinals on September 10, 2007.  As a vested veteran, the Cardinals would have been required to guarantee Badger's salary if he remained on the week one roster.  Badger was quickly re-signed on September 13, 2007.   He was cut again by the Arizona Cardinals on October 30, 2007.

Personal life
Badger is married to the former Mercedes Cisneros, daughter of Henry Cisneros.  They dated and met at Stanford University.  The couple have two daughters named Karina and Natalia.

References

1975 births
Living people
American football offensive guards
American football offensive tackles
Arizona Cardinals players
Minnesota Vikings players
Oakland Raiders players
Stanford Cardinal football players
Sportspeople from Corvallis, Oregon
Washington Redskins players
Players of American football from Oregon
Corvallis High School (Oregon) alumni